Torture Chamber is a 2013 horror film written and directed by Dante Tomaselli. The movie first released on October 10, 2013 at the Sitges Film Festival and was released onto DVD on January 28, 2014. The film stars Vincent Pastore, Christie Sanford, and Lynn Lowry, and follows a family trying to save a teen boy from demonic possession. This marks a change from Tomaselli's usual horror formula, as prior films showed adults in the role of monster.

Synopsis
13-year-old burn victim Jimmy Morgan (Carmen LoPorto) isn't happy. When he starts exhibiting strange powers, he begins to use them on all of the people that he believes has looked down upon him or did him wrong. His brother Mark (Richard D. Busser) tries desperately to use his skills as a Catholic priest to save Jimmy, but is wildly unsuccessful. Not only does Jimmy manage to escape, but he also transforms the town's children into a bloodthirsty army that drags its prey to an abandoned castle. There Jimmy and the children torture their captives in extremely disturbing and horrific ways.

Cast
Vincent Pastore as Dr. Fiore
Christie Sanford as Mrs. Morgan
Lynn Lowry as Lisa Marino
Carmen LoPorto as Jimmy Morgan
Ron Millkie as Dr. Thompson
Richard D. Busser as Father Mark Morgan
Ellie Pettit as Heather
Steven Lobman as Andy
Raine Brown as Hope
Danny Lopes as Ralph

Reception
Critical reception for Torture Chamber has been mostly positive, with many reviewers stating that the film would have a limited appeal to viewers expecting a more mainstream horror film. Fearnet and Ain't It Cool News both criticized the film's acting but praised the film overall, with Fearnet calling it "a messy, scrappy, sometimes silly horror film that occasionally taps into something old-school scary." In contrast, Fangoria's Chris Alexander and AV Maniacs both praised the film's acting, with Alexander stating that the movie "traps its audience in an environment and won’t let them go until it’s finished with them."

References

External links

2013 films
2013 horror films
2010s English-language films